Andrew Haruna (born 4 April 1957) is a Nigerian academic. He is a professor of linguistics and Nigerian languages, and is also the current vice chancellor of the Federal University of Gashua.

Early life and education
Haruna was born in 1957 in Bauchi State. He attended primary school in Bauchi and secondary school in Bornu. He then attended the University of Maiduguri, where he was awarded BA (Honors) in linguistics. He proceeded to the University of London, where he attained his MSc and PhD in 1985 and 1990.

Nomination and awards

Andrew Haruna was nominated as the most outstanding plenipotentiary for the Kwame Nkrumah leadership award 2016–2017 which he won.

References

1957 births
Academic staff of the Federal University, Gashua
Living people